The Cosquer Cave is located in the Calanque de Morgiou in Marseille, France, near Cap Morgiou. The entrance to the cave is located  underwater, due to the Holocene sea level rise. The cave contains various prehistoric rock art engravings. Its submarine entrance was discovered in 1985 by  Henri Cosquer, a professional diver. The underwater passage leading to the cave was progressively explored until 1990 by cave divers without the divers being aware of the archaeological character of the cave. It is only in the last period (1990-1991) of the progressive underwater explorations that the cave divers emerged in the non-submerged part of the cave. The prehistoric paintings were not immediately discovered by the divers to first emerge from the other side of the sump. The cave was named after Henri Cosquer, when its existence was made public in 1991, after three divers became lost in the cave and died.

Description

Discovery and history
Henri Cosquer, a professional diver in Cassis, discovered the drowned entrance to the cave which had been indicated to him by a diver friend in 1985. That same year, he progressively explored the submersed gallery alone and then with a friend and diving instructor from his club until he reached the "stratum" (the part where the gallery narrows and turns 90° to open into the underground lake). Cosquer went back alone once in 1985, discovered the underground lake, but a lamp breakdown forced him to turn back and he was left with a good scare. In June 1990, Cosquer asked for the help of two Belgian cave divers, the brothers Bernard and Marc Van Espen, who had come to dive in Cassis. Following Cosquer's instructions, the two brothers found the entrance of the gallery at -37 metres at the foot of the Pointe de la Voile, near Cap Morgiou. They followed the ascending gallery, swimming slowly and carefully near the ceiling of the gallery to avoid lifting the particles of silt and fine clayey sediments covering the floor in order to not compromise the underwater visibility (to avoid silt out). They arrived at the underground lake topped by the air bell seen by Cosquer in 1985. Their guide line being too short, the Van Espen brothers were forced to turn back in order to exit safely by following their guide line towards the entrance of the gallery without being able to emerge in the bell. At this stage, the non-submerged part of the cave had still not been explored.

In June 1991, Marc Van Espen was back in Cassis and on June 24 he dove again with Henri Cosquer, both of them determined to finally go to the end of this cave. On this occasion, Marc Van Espen achieved the installation of the last section of the guide line essential to the safety for progression into the immersed part of the cave. Their incursion into the cave only lasted about thirty minutes and only allowed them to briefly explore the first room to which the sump gives direct access. A few days later, on July 9, 1991, Cosquer decided to go back to explore the cave to estimate its extent in the company of friends and instructors of his diving club: Cendrine Cosquer (his niece), Yann Gogan and Pascale Oriol. It was during this dive that a more detailed exploration of the unflooded part of the cave was carried out. Yann Gogan then saw the outline of a hand on a wall, while Pascale Oriol put forward the hypothesis of a cave painting. This discovery, as disconcerting as it was unexpected, prompted the "team of four" to return and actively search for other traces. Several dives in July and August 1991 enabled them to discover the cave paintings and to make films and photos with the help of Thierry Pelissier and Gilles Sourice (Fanny Broadcast – Les films du soleil).

On September 1, 1991, there was a triple fatal accident in the cave. Three divers from Grenoble did not find the exit of the access gallery (175 m). Henri and Yann participated in the recovery of the bodies of the three victims in the gallery. Two days later, on 3 September 1991, Henri declared the cave to the Maritime Affairs Department in Marseille.

The file was transmitted to the Direction des recherches archéologiques sous-marines (DRASM) and then to the Service régional de l'archéologie (Regional Archaeological Service) under the Ministry of Culture.

An expertise took place from 18 to 20 September 1991, with the assistance of the DRASM vessel, the Archéonaute. It was conducted by Jean Courtin, a French prehistorian and experienced diver, and Jean Clottes, a French specialist in cave art.

When the discovery was announced, doubts were raised about the authenticity of the figures. Various French prehistorians, such as Brigitte and Gilles Delluc or Denis Vialou, expressed reservations.

In June 1992, a new mission allowed, among other things, the shooting of a film entitled "The Secret of the Cosquer Cave".

From 2001 to 2005, five programmed archaeological research operations were organised under the responsibility of Luc Vanrell (IMMADRAS (Société de travaux sous marins) / DRAC PACA / LAMPEA (LAboratoire Méditerranéen de Préhistoire Europe Afrique)), then five others from 2010 to 2015 (no operation in 2012) under the same direction, with the collaboration of Michel Olive (DRAC PACA / LAMPEA).

The Ministry of Culture and Henri Cosquer are involved in a dispute, which is based on the law on preventive archaeology of 17 January 2001, which grants the inventor compensation – a lump-sum payment or a thirty-year profit-sharing scheme – paid by the operator on the basis of the evaluation of the archaeological interest of the cave. Henri Cosquer also claimed a reward and the recovery of part of the proceeds from the sale of books of photographs of the cave.

Prehistoric paintings

Four fifths of the cave, including any cave wall art, were permanently or periodically submerged and destroyed by sea water. Nearly 500 instances of cave art remain which date back to two distinct periods during the Upper Paleolithic. The first phase, from around 27,000 years BP (the Gravettian Era), is represented by art consisting of 65 hand stencils, 44 in black and 21 in red. Art from the more recent period dates to 19,000 years BP (the Solutrean Era) and features much more complex depictions of various animals and human figures. In total there are 177 animals drawings found in the cave these include 63 horses, 28 ibex, 17 deer, 10 bison, and 7 aurochs. There is also the more unusual depiction of 16 marine animals including 9 seals and 3 great auks as well as some jellyfish and various figures which could be either fish or cetaceans. Of the human figures there are numerous sexual symbols but also one example of "the killed man" motif which can be seen in other caves such as at Lascaux.

See also
 List of Stone Age art
 Great auk (in cave art)

References

Further reading

 Jean Clottes, Jean Courtin, La grotte Cosquer, Seuil, 1994,  (French)
 Jean Clottes, Jean Courtin, Luc Vanrell, Cosquer redécouvert, Seuil, 2005,  (French)
 The Cave Beneath the Sea: Paleolithic Images at Cosquer by Jean Clottes and Jean Courtin (1996) Harry N. Abrams, Inc., New York  English translation by Marilyn Garner from the French edition

External links

 Cosquer’s Cave Grotto Cosquer
 Prehistory and coastal karst area: Cosquer Cave and the “Calanques” of Marseille
 Official French Ministry of Culture pages on Submarine archaeology
 
 The Cosquer Cave Prehistoric Images and Medicines Under the Sea by Jean Clottes, Jean Courtin and Luc Vanrell

Prehistoric sites in France
Caves of France
Rock art in France
Caves containing pictograms in France
Landforms of Bouches-du-Rhône
Tourist attractions in Bouches-du-Rhône
Prehistoric art in France
Landforms of Provence-Alpes-Côte d'Azur
Massif des Calanques